Sebastiano Bianchi was an Italian engraver, active c.1580. He produced plates of devotional subjects. Among others is a print representing the Emblems of our Saviour's Sufferings, with Angels.

References

Italian engravers
Renaissance engravers
Year of birth unknown
Year of death unknown
16th-century Italian artists